Bogach is a village on the island of Barra in the Outer Hebrides, Scotland. Bogach is also within the parish of Barra, and is situated on a minor road, linked to the A888. It consists of just 8 crofts, each of which lies on a small strip of land running from north coast to south. It separates the main island at Bagherivagh from the peninsula known as Bruairnis.

References

External links

Canmore - Barra, North Bay, Bay Hirivagh site record
Canmore - Barra, Boggach site record
Canmore - Barra, Boggach site record

Villages on Barra